The British Academy presents 18 awards and medals to recognise achievement in the humanities and social sciences.

Overview 
The British Academy currently awards 18 prizes and medals:

General awards:
 British Academy Medal (for academic research that has "transformed understanding" of a field of the humanities or social sciences)
 The President's Medal (for "outstanding service" to the humanities or social sciences)
 Leverhulme Medal and Prize (for "significant contribution to knowledge or understanding" in a field of the humanities or social sciences)

Discipline-specific awards:

 Brian Barry Prize in Political Science
 Burkitt Medal for Biblical Studies
 Derek Allen Prize (for numismatics, Celtic studies or musicology)
 Edward Ullendorff Medal (for Semitic languages and Ethiopian studies)
 Grahame Clark Medal (for prehistoric archaeology)
 Kenyon Medal (for classical studies and archaeology)
 Landscape Archaeology Medal
 Nayef Al-Rodhan Prize (for global cultural understanding)
 Neil and Saras Smith Medal for Linguistics
 Peter Townsend Prize (for the sociology of poverty, ageing or health)
 Rose Mary Crawshay Prize (for English literature scholarship; women only)
 Serena Medal (for Italian studies)
 Sir Israel Gollancz Prize (for English literature scholarship)
 Wiley Prize in Economics
 Wiley Prize in Psychology

Prizes and medals

Brian Barry Prize in Political Science
The Brian Barry Prize in Political Science is awarded jointly by the British Academy, the Cambridge University Press, and the British Journal of Political Science. It was named in honour of Brian Barry and first awarded in 2014. It is awarded annually to an individual or group "for excellence in political science, as displayed in an unpublished essay". The prize is £2500 and the winning essay is published in the British Journal of Political Science.

List of Recipients:
 2014: Helder De Schutter and Dr Lea Ypi, for 'Mandatory Citizenship for Immigrants'
 2015: Parashar Kulkarni, for 'Are There Cultural Prerequisites to Effective Property Rights?: Evidence from Inheritance Rights of Widows in Colonial India'
 2016: William Roberts Clark, Professor Matt Golder, and Professor Sona N. Golder, for 'An Exit, Voice, and Loyalty Model of Politics'
 2017: Jonathan White, for 'The Ethics of Political Alliance'
 2018: Zeynep Pamuk, of St John's College, Oxford, for 'Justifying Public Funding for Science.
 2019: Andre Santos Campos, for 'Representing the Future: The Interests of Future Persons in Representative Democracy'
 2020: Jonathan Havercroft, for 'Why is there no just riot theory?'

British Academy Medal

The British Academy Medal was established in 2013. It is awarded annually "for academic research that has transformed understanding in a field of the humanities and social sciences".

Burkitt Medal

The Burkitt Medal for Biblical Studies was established in 1923. It is awarded annually "in recognition of special service to Biblical Studies", with the area of study alternating between the Hebrew Bible and the New Testament.

Derek Allen Prize 

The Derek Allen Prize was founded in 1976 to honour Derek Allen, FBA, who was secretary (1969–73) and treasurer (1973–75) of the British Academy; it was established by his widow and sons to recognise outstanding scholarly achievement in Allen's principal interests: numismatics, Celtic studies and musicology. Although awarded annually, the prize rotates between the three disciplines. Recipients are awarded £400.

Edward Ullendorff Medal 
The Edward Ullendorff Medal was created in 2012 to honour Professor Edward Ullendorff, FBA, who had died the previously year; its establishment was supported by his widow. Award annually, the medal recognizes "scholarly distinction and achievements in the field of Semitic Languages and Ethiopian Studies".

List of recipients:

 2012: Simon Hopkins, FBA, Hebrew University, Jerusalem.
 2013: Getatchew Haile, FBA, Hill Museum & Manuscript Library of Saint John's University, USA.
 2014: David Appleyard, School of African and Oriental Studies.
 2015: Siegbert Uhlig, University of Hamburg.
 2016: Sebastian Brock, FBA, University of Oxford.
 2017: Veronika Six, University of Hamburg.
 2018: John Huehnergard, The University of Texas at Austin
 2019: Michael Knibb, King's College London
 2020: Otto Jastrow, "for his leading scholarship in the field of Arabic and Neo-Aramaic spoken dialects"
 2021: Olga Kapeliuk

Grahame Clark Medal 

The Grahame Clark Medal endowed in 1992 by Sir Grahame Clark and first awarded in 1993. It is awarded every two years "for academic achievement involving recent contributions to the study of prehistoric archaeology".

Kenyon Medal

The Kenyon Medal was endowed by Sir Frederic Kenyon and awarded for the first time in 1957. It is awarded every two years "in recognition of work in the fields of classical studies and archaeology".

Landscape Archaeology Medal
The Landscape Archaeology Medal is awarded every two years "for distinguished achievements in landscape archaeology". It was first awarded in 2007.

List of Recipients:

 2007: Andrew Fleming
 2009: Tony Wilkinson
 2011: Conor Newman
 2013: Christopher Taylor
 2015: David Hall
 2017: Tom Williamson, "for his significant contribution to the study of landscape history and archaeology"
 2019: Dominic Powlesland
 2020: Keith Branigan, "for his distinguished and varied career with many notable achievements in the study of Roman Britain and the prehistory of the Aegean"

Leverhulme Medal and Prize

The Leverhulme Medal and Prize was created 2002 and is sponsored by The Leverhulme Trust. It is awarded every three years "for significant contribution to knowledge and understanding in a field within the humanities and social sciences". It is worth £5000.

The British Academy Book Prize for Global Cultural Understanding
The British Academy Book Prize (formerly the Nayef Al-Rodhan Prize for Global Cultural Understanding) was established by Nayef Al-Rodhan in 2013. It is awarded annually for "outstanding scholarly contributions to global cultural understanding". It is worth £25,000.

List of Recipients:

 Nayef Al-Rodhan Prize for Transcultural Understanding
 2013: Karen Armstrong, "in recognition of her body of work that has made a significant contribution to understanding the elements of overlap and commonality in different cultures and religions"
 2014: Jonathan Jansen, University of the Free State, South Africa, for his book Knowledge in the Blood: Confronting Race and the Apartheid Past (2009)
 2015: Neil MacGregor, British Museum, for his books A History of the World in 100 Objects (2010) and Germany: Memories Of A Nation (2014)
 2016: Carole Hillenbrand, University of Edinburgh, for her book Islam: A New Historical Introduction (2015).
 Nayef Al-Rodhan Prize for Global Cultural Understanding
 2017: Timothy Garton Ash, University of Oxford, for his book "Free Speech: Ten Principles for a Connected World" (2016).
 2018: Kapka Kassabova for her book Border: A Journey to the Edge of Europe.
 2019: Toby Green for his book A Fistful of Shells: West Africa from the rise of the slave trade to the age of revolution.
2020: Hazel V. Carby for her book Imperial Intimacies: A Tale of Two Islands
2021: Sujit Sivasundaram for Waves Across the South: A new history of revolution and empire

Neil and Saras Smith Medal for Linguistics
The Neil and Saras Smith Medal for Linguistics is awarded annually to an individual for "lifetime achievement in the scholarly study of linguistics". It was established by Neil Smith in 2013, and first awarded in 2014.

List of Recipients:

 2014: Noam Chomsky FBA 
 2015: William Labov, "for his significant contribution to linguistics and the language sciences"
 2016: Sir John Lyons FBA, "for his outstanding lifetime contribution to the field of linguistics"
 2017: Bernard Comrie FBA, "for his significant contributions to the study of language universals, linguistic typology and language history"
 2018: Barbara Partee FBA (University of Massachusetts Amherst), for "her leading contributions to the study of semantics, syntax and pragmatics".
 2019: Deirdre Wilson FBA (University College London) 
 2020: Paul Kiparsky FBA (Stanford University), for "his research on phonology and historical linguistics".
 2021: Marianne Mithun (University of California, Santa Barbara)

Peter Townsend Prize 
The Peter Townsend Prize was created in 2011 to honour the sociologist Professor Peter Townsend, FBA, who had died in 2009. The prize is awarded biennially to recognise "outstanding work with policy relevance on a topic to which Townsend made a major contribution." Nominations are made for "a published work with policy relevance and academic merit on poverty and inequality; ageing and the lives of older people; disability and inequalities in health." The prize is awarded with £2,000.

List of recipients:

 2011: Julia Johnson, Sheena Rolph and Randall Smith for Residential Care Transformed: Revisiting 'The Last Refuge 2013: Tracy Shildrick, Professor Robert MacDonald, Colin Webster and Kayleigh Garthwaite for Poverty and Insecurity: Life in Low-Pay, No-Pay Britain
 2015: Andrew Sayer for Why We Can't Afford the Rich
 2017: Kayleigh Garthwaite for Hunger Pains: Life Inside Foodbank Britain
 2019: Steven King for Writing the Lives of the English Poor 1750s-1830s
 2021: John Stewart for Richard Titmuss: A Commitment to Welfare

President's Medal

The President's Medal is awarded annually by the British Academy to up to five individuals or organisations for "outstanding service to the cause of the humanities and social sciences". It was first award in 2010.

Rose Mary Crawshay Prize

The Rose Mary Crawshay Prize was created in 1888 as The Byron, Shelley, Keats In Memoriam Yearly Prize Fund by Rose Mary Crawshay (1828–1907). In 1914, the fund was transferred to the British Academy. The newly renamed Rose Mary Crawshay Prize was first awarded in 1916. It is awarded annually "for a historical or critical work on any subject connected with English Literature by a woman of any nationality" and is worth £500.

 Serena Medal 
The Serena Medal was established in 1920 and is awarded annually for "eminent services towards the furtherance of the study of Italian history, philosophy or music, literature, art, or economics."List of recipients:"Winners of the Serena Medal", British Academy. Retrieved 13 May 2018.

 1920 Dr G. M. Trevelyan
 1921 Dr Paget Toynbee
 1922 Professor E. G. Gardner
 1923 Dr Horatio Brown
 1924 Edward Hutton
 1925 No award
 1926 Edward Armstrong
 1927 Benedetto Croce
 1928 Senatore Giovanni Gentile
 1929 No award
 1930 Commendatore Ettore Modigliani
 1931 Countess Martinego-Cesaresco
 1932 Professor Cesare Foligno
 1933 Professor Thomas Okey
 1934 Lord Rennell
 1935 Professor Mario Praz
 1936 No award
 1937 Professor G. de Sanctis
 1938 Eugénie Sellers Strong
 1939 No award
 1940 Evelyn M. Jamison
 1941 G. F.-H. Berkeley
 1942 Professor Gaetano Salvemini
 1943 Bernard Berenson
 1944–45 No award
 1946 Dr Giovanni Poggi 
 1947 No award 
 1948 Sir George Hill 
 1949 No award 
 1950 Professor Etienne Gilson 
 1951 Professor Giuseppe Lugli 
 1952 No award 
 1953 Professor Carlo Dionisotti 
 1954 Professor Frederico Chabod 
 1955 Lord Clark 
 1956 Dr Umberto Zanotti-Bianco 
 1957 Professor Rudolf Wittkower 
 1958 Dr P. O. Kristeller 
 1959 Professor Bruno Nardi 
 1960 Denis Mack Smith 
 1961 Sir John Pope-Hennessy
 1962 J. B. Ward-Perkins
 1963 Professor Johannes Wilde
 1964 No award
 1965 Professor Axel Boethius
 1966 Paola Zancani
 1967 Professor Edgar Wind
 1968 Professor Ludwig Heydenreich
 1969 Professor Roberto Weiss
 1970 Professor R. Longhi
 1971  R. Bianchi Bandinelli
 1972 J. Denis Mahon
 1973 Professor E. R. Vincent
 1974 Professor N. Rubinstein
 1975 Professor Eugenio Garin
 1976 Professor Cecil Grayson
 1977 Professor Augusto Campana
 1978 Professor Wolfgang Lotz
 1979 Professor John Shearman
 1980 Professor Massimo Pallottino
 1981 Professor Giulio Einaudi
 1982 Professor Paola Barocchi
 1983 Professor Franco Venturi
 1984 Professor J. H. Whitfield
 1985 Professor Francis Haskell
 1986 Sir John Hale
 1987 Christopher Seton-Watson
 1988 Dr Philip Jones
 1989 Sir Harold Acton
 1990 Dr Daniel Waley
 1991 Professor Brian Pullan, FBA, University of Manchester 
 1992 Dr J. I. R. Montagu 
 1993 Professor George Holmes 
 1994 Professor Patrick Boyde, FBA, University of Cambridge
 1995 Hugh Honour
 1996 Professor Giovanni Aquilecchia
 1997 Professor Michael Mallett
 1998 Professor J. A. Davis
 1999 Professor Michael Talbot
 2000 Professor Giulio Lepschy, FBA
 2001 Professor Michael Hirst, FBA
 2002 Professor John Woodhouse
 2003 Professor Stuart Woolf
 2004 Professor William Weaver
 2005 Ronald Lightbown
 2006 Professor Paul Ginsborg
 2007 Professor Conor Fahy
 2008 Professor Philip Gossett, Robert W. Reneker Distinguished Service Professor of Music, University of Chicago and Professore Ordinario “di chiara fama”, Università “La Sapienza”, Rome
 2009 Professor Giorgio Chittolini, Professor of Medieval History, University of Milan
 2010 Professor Anna Laura Lepschy, Emeritus Professor, University College London
 2011 Professor Patricia Fortini Brown, Emeritus Professor, Princeton University
 2012 Professor Richard Bellamy, University College London
 2013 Professor Pier Vincenzo Mengaldo, University of Padua
 2014 Chris Wickham, FBA, University of Oxford
 2015 Brian A'Hearn, University of Oxford
 2016 Geoffrey Nowell-Smith, Queen Mary University of London
 2017 Martin McLaughlin, University of Oxford
 2018 Roger Parker, FBA, King's College London
 2019 Professor John Foot, University of Bristol
 2020 Professor Jill Kraye "for her scholarship on Renaissance philosophy and humanism and the later European influence of classical philosophy (Aristotelianism, Platonism, Epicureanism and Stoicism)"
 2021 Professor Lucrezia Reichlin, FBA, London Business School

Sir Israel Gollancz Prize

The Sir Israel Gollancz Prize was created in 1924 as the Biennial Prize for English Literature. The name was changed to honour Israel Gollancz after his death in 1930. It is "awarded biennially for work connected with Anglo-Saxon, Early English Language and Literature, English Philology, or the History of English Language". It is worth £400.

 Wiley Prize in Economics 
The Wiley Prize in Economics was established in 2013 and is sponsored by the publisher Wiley; awarded annually, it recognises "achievement in research by an outstanding early career economist." The recipient is awarded £5,000.List of recipients 2013: Philipp Kircher, University of Edinburgh
 2014: Vasco Carvalho, University of Cambridge
 2015: Johannes Spinnewijn, London School of Economics and Political Science
 2016: James Fenske, University of Warwick
 2017: Matthew Elliott, University of Cambridge
 2018: Mirko Draca, University of Warwick

 Wiley Prize in Psychology 
The Wiley Prize in Psychology was established in 2009 and is made in partnership with the publisher Wiley; awarded annually, it recognises "lifetime achievement by an outstanding international scholar and promising early-career work by a UK-based psychologist, within 5 years of receipt of their doctorate." The award is given out to the former in odd years and the latter in even years. The recipient is awarded £5,000.List of recipients'

 2009: Martin Seligman, Albert A Fox Leadership Professor at the University of Pennsylvania and Director of the University's Positive Psychology Center
 2010: Essi Viding, Reader in Developmental Psychopathology, University College, London
 2011: Michael Tomasello, Wolfgang Köhler Primate Research Center, Leipzig
 2012: Yulia Kovas, Goldsmiths, University of London
 2013: Anne Treisman, FBA FRS, Princeton University
 2014: Richard Cook, City University London
 2015: Peter Fonagy, FBA, University College London
 2016: Stephen Fleming, University College London
 2017: Stanislas Dehaene, FBA, INSERM-CEA Cognitive Neuroimaging Unit
 2018: Sarah Lloyd-Fox, Birkbeck, University of London; University of Cambridge

See also

 List of general awards in the humanities
 List of social sciences awards

References

British Academy
Academic awards
British awards
Humanities awards
Social sciences awards